Holiday Hit Squad is a British television program broadcast on BBC One and presented by Angela Rippon, Helen Skelton and Joe Crowley. It sorts out holiday/hotel problems

References

External links

2006 British television series debuts
2014 British television series endings
BBC high definition shows
BBC television documentaries
British travel television series
Television series by ITV Studios
English-language television shows